is a fictional character in Arc System Works's Guilty Gear video game series. She first appeared in the 2002 video game Guilty Gear X2 as a boss. In the series, I-No is one of That Man's servants and often serves as an antagonist. She fights with an electric guitar, and she also wears a sentient witch's hat that can fire projectiles.

Video game reviewers have commented on her sex appeal, with some of them also remarking her winning pose as well as her clothes and electric guitar. Her fighting abilities and the difficulty to defeat her as a boss have also been noted by critics.

Conception and design
I-No's primary weapon of choice is a guitar she calls "Marlene", a direct replica of Duesenberg Guitars company's "Starplayer TV" real-life guitar model. The name is a reference to German actress and singer Marlene Dietrich. Her appearance is based on musician Sheena Ringo early career attire and guitar choice, down to them both even being of exactly same "surf green" color.

Appearances
I-No was first introduced in the third installment of the series, Guilty Gear X2 (2002), where she appears as the primary antagonist and final boss. She carries with her an electric guitar nicknamed  that she uses to fight both using it as a bludgeon and playing it to create deadly sonic waves, and she also fights with her hat that can shoot projectiles out of a secret hole. I-No is one of Asuka R. Kreutz's servants, and she appears in every character's storyline, manipulating them against each other—for example, she gives fake bounty lists with the name of the people her master wants to kill, consisting entirely of other cast members, to Jam Kuradoberi and Bridget.

As she works for personal gain instead of being only a puppet, in Guilty Gear XX Accent Core Plus (2008), she forces Asuka into recruiting Anji Mito to capture her, eventually succeeding. She has three possible endings: she is captured by That Man and Raven to be punished, and she argues she only wanted to remove those who stood in her boss' way, but her master says that they're beneficial to what he has in mind for the world; she fights and defeats Dizzy and May, either subsequently becoming overwhelmed by Dizzy's power, and kidnapping May; or she is defeated by Baiken, being stabbed repeatedly, thus leading to her death.

I-No is a playable character in Guilty Gear Xrd (2014), where she helped Asuka in dealing with the Conclave and Ariels while becoming associated with Axl Low due to their similar powers.

I-No is also a playable character in the spin-off games Guilty Gear Isuka (2003), Dust Strikers (2006), Judgment (2006), Medal Masters (2015), and   Epic Seven (2018).

I-No returns in the 2021 video game Guilty Gear Strive as its main antagonist. The game's storyline reveals that I-No was artificially created by The Original as a replacement for the Universal Will when it became humanity's enemy, I-No being created from humanity's collective desire for a future. But I-No's existence threatens to unravel reality, forcing The Original to absorb half of her power into himself to prevent that calamity at the cost of his sanity. I-No allied herself with Asuka to capture the current Universal Will’s vessel, Ariels, in hopes to releasing the one who hid within the Universal Will to regain her full power from them. With Ariels is imprisoned at Illyrian Castle prison, she released The Original, now known as Happy Chaos, who helps the former in restoring her true godly power. To do so, they made Nagoriyuki a pawn and use a material of his sword to dispose Sol Badguy, and steal the Tome of Origin from Asuka so Chaos can return her godly power. I-No allows herself be capture to ensure Chaos’ plan goes well. Once regaining her power, I-No resolves to bestow her power humanity while repeatedly recreating the universe until she finds what she seeks. But she is ultimately destroyed by Sol. In her final moments, she uses her axis of time powers to reunite Axl with his beloved Megumi, who is revealed to be I-No's younger self from an alternate timeline, while leaving weapon-based guitar Marlene in Axl’s care.

Reception
In a 2013 poll conducted by Arc System Works, I-No was voted as the 20th most popular character from the series. IGN named I-No their "first-favorite new character design" from Guilty Gear X2. GameDaily ranked I-No thirteenth on their "Top 25 Most Bizarre Fighting Characters", repeating the sentiment in a later article series called "Babe of Week", featuring her in "Asian Beauties" and "Guilty Gear Babes". Complex placed the boss battle with I-No in Guilty Gear X2 #Reload as the fourteenth coolest boss battle of all time, saying she is not a hard boss "but the fact that she fights with a blue guitar is pretty amazing", and along with her stage, the hell above the clouds, "you have one epic boss battle." Plenty of people assorted Daisuke Ishiwatari quotes about her being the hardest boss. They also elected I-No as the twenty-sixth "hottest video game character", and ranked her at thirty-sixth place on the list of "The 50 Most Dominant Fighting Game Characters", where they commented "She fought with an electric guitar. Her cleavage was godlike. She cut you with a guitar extension cord. She got half naked when she won. 'Nuff said."

Destructoid included I-No on it "Badass of the Month", and described her as a combination of "[s]exy and deadly", adding "[w]e've seen it for years with characters like Morrigan and Chun-Li [...], but no one captured it quite like I-No, who induced many a people into chucking their controllers in frustration". They also noted the difficult defeat her in the game, saying "she is a total nightmare to fight against." Joystiq ranked her first on their "top ten girls of PSP", noting her guitar is very appreciated by fans and that it makes her sexier. UGO Networks ranked her finish move as the third "Most Gruesome Finishing Move" in video game's history, also including I-No in their "Hot Girls We Wish Were Real" list at the fourteenth place. Joystiq's Jordan Mallory said her top removal victory pose "conjures up nostalgic memories of after-school" while GameDaily described it as "quite a reward in the game".

Marlene
I-No's primary weapon of choice is a guitar she calls "Marlene", which she uses as a blunt object to bludgeon her opponents. This guitar is actually a direct replica of Duesenberg Guitars company's "Starplayer TV" (also known as "Starplayer II") real-life guitar model, though it was reinforced with such materials as titanium and aerospace-grade aluminum so that Marlene would be able to withstand such actions as heavy impacts when I-No is hitting her opponents or when this guitar is being directly smashed against the ground. The name "Marlene" that I-No gave to her beloved guitar is actually based on the German actress and singer Marlene Dietrich, as well as also being a direct nod to the musician Shiina Yumiko (since she has a guitar named "Dietrich" that is actually a Duesenberg Guitars' "Starplayer II/TV" model as well, down to them both even being of exactly same "surf green" color, and I-No's overall visual design was heavily based on Shiina Yumiko's choice of hairstyle and stage performing clothes during early years of her career).

See also
List of Guilty Gear characters

References

Female characters in video games
Female video game villains
Fictional mass murderers
Fictional rock musicians
Fictional servants
Guilty Gear characters
Musician characters in video games
Video game bosses
Video game characters introduced in 2002
Video game characters who use magic
Woman soldier and warrior characters in video games